Francisco Aday Benítez Caraballo (born 16 December 1987), known as Aday, is a Spanish former professional footballer. Mainly a winger, he could also play as a full-back.

He achieved Segunda División figures of 157 games and five goals over six seasons, with Girona (five years) and Tenerife (one). He appeared in La Liga with the first of those clubs.

Club career

Early career
Born in Sentmenat, Barcelona, Catalonia, Aday finished his development at local EC Granollers, making his senior debut with neighbouring CE Premià in the Tercera División. He first arrived in the Segunda División B in 2009 when he joined UE Sant Andreu, contributing 25 games and two goals in his first season as the team failed to promote in the play-offs.

Aday signed for CE L'Hospitalet in June 2011. In his second year he scored a career-best seven goals, with the side also being eliminated in post-season play.

Tenerife
On 5 July 2013, Aday moved to CD Tenerife, recently promoted to Segunda División. On 1 September he made his debut as a professional, playing the last 22 minutes of a 2–0 away loss against CD Mirandés.

Girona
On 16 July 2014, Aday joined Girona FC in the same league after terminating his contract with the Canarian club. He scored his first goal in the second tier on 4 October, the second in a 3–0 home win over SD Ponferradina after one minute on the pitch.

Aday featured regularly for the Blanquivermells the following campaigns, making 35 appearances in 2016–17 as they achieved promotion to La Liga for the first time ever. He made his debut in the competition on 19 August 2017, starting in the 2–2 home draw against Atlético Madrid.

Aday scored his first goal in the Spanish top flight on 23 October 2017, opening a 2–1 away defeat of Deportivo de La Coruña through a penalty kick. The following 7 February, he extended his contract until 2021.

In March 2023, already retired, Aday revealed that he was offered €50,000 to lose a match against Córdoba CF six years earlier, as Girona had already secured top-division promotion.

References

External links

1987 births
Living people
Spanish footballers
Footballers from Catalonia
Association football wingers
La Liga players
Segunda División players
Segunda División B players
Tercera División players
CE Premià players
UE Sant Andreu footballers
CE L'Hospitalet players
CD Tenerife players
Girona FC players